This is a list of species in the agaric genus Gymnopus. The genus contains about 300 species.


A B C D E F G H I J K L M N O P Q R S T U V U W X Y Z

A
Gymnopus agricola
Gymnopus albistrictus
Gymnopus alcalinolens
Gymnopus alkalivirens
Gymnopus allegreti
Gymnopus alnicola
Gymnopus alpicola
Gymnopus alpinus
Gymnopus amygdalisporus
Gymnopus aquosus
Gymnopus asetosus Antonín, R.Ryoo & K.H.Ka (2014) – Korea
Gymnopus atratoides
Gymnopus atrigilvus
Gymnopus aurantiacus
Gymnopus aurantiipes
Gymnopus austrosemihirtipes
Gymnopus avellaneidiscus
Gymnopus avellaneigriseus

B

Gymnopus barbipes R.H.Petersen & K.W.Hughes (2014) – North America
Gymnopus beltraniae
Gymnopus benoistii
Gymnopus bicolor
Gymnopus biformis
Gymnopus bisporiger
Gymnopus bisporus
Gymnopus brassicolens
Gymnopus brunneigracilis
Gymnopus brunnescens
Gymnopus bulliformis
Gymnopus butyraceus-trichopus

C

Gymnopus carnosus
Gymnopus caryophilus
Gymnopus castaneus
Gymnopus catalonicus
Gymnopus cervinicolor
Gymnopus cinchonensis
Gymnopus cockaynei
Gymnopus collybioides
Gymnopus confluens
Gymnopus coniceps
Gymnopus contrarius
Gymnopus coracicolor
Gymnopus cremeimellus
Gymnopus cremeostipitatus Antonín, R.Ryoo & K.H.Ka (2014) – Korea
Gymnopus cremoraceus
Gymnopus cylindricus

D

Gymnopus dentatus
Gymnopus denticulatus
Gymnopus detersibilis
Gymnopus dichrous
Gymnopus diminutus
Gymnopus discipes
Gymnopus disjunctus R.H.Petersen & K.W.Hughes (2014) – North America
Gymnopus domesticus
Gymnopus druceae
Gymnopus dryophilus
Gymnopus dysodes
Gymnopus dysosmus

E
Gymnopus earleae Murrill 1916
Gymnopus eatonae Murrill 1916
Gymnopus ellisii Murrill 1917
Gymnopus eneficola R.H.Petersen 2014 – Newfoundland, Canada
Gymnopus erythropus (Pers.) Antonín, Halling & Noordel. 1997
Gymnopus expallens (Peck) Murrill 1916
Gymnopus exsculptus  (Fr.) Murrill 1916

F

Gymnopus fagiphilus
Gymnopus farinaceus
Gymnopus fasciatus
Gymnopus fibrosipes
Gymnopus flavescens
Gymnopus floridanus
Gymnopus fuegianus
Gymnopus fuliginellus
Gymnopus fulvidiscus
Gymnopus fuscolilacinus
Gymnopus fuscopurpureus
Gymnopus fuscotramus Mešić, Tkalčec & Chun Y. Deng (2011) – China
Gymnopus fusipes

G
Gymnopus gibbosus
Gymnopus glabrocystidiatus Antonín, R.Ryoo & K.H.Ka (2014) – Korea
Gymnopus glatfelteri
Gymnopus griseifolius

H
Gymnopus hariolorum
Gymnopus herinkii
Gymnopus hondurensis
Gymnopus huijsmanii
Gymnopus hybridus

I
Gymnopus impudicus
Gymnopus incarnatus
Gymnopus indoctoides
Gymnopus indoctus
Gymnopus inexpectatus
Gymnopus inodorus
Gymnopus inusitatus
Gymnopus iocephalus

J
Gymnopus jamaicensis
Gymnopus johnstonii
Gymnopus junquilleus

K
Gymnopus kauffmanii
Gymnopus kidsoniae

L

Gymnopus lachnophyllus
Gymnopus lanipes
Gymnopus lodgeae
Gymnopus loiseleurietorum
Gymnopus luxurians

M
Gymnopus macropus
Gymnopus mammillatus
Gymnopus melanopus
Gymnopus menehune
Gymnopus mesoamericanus
Gymnopus micromphaleoides R.H.Petersen & K.W.Hughes (2014) – North America
Gymnopus microspermus
Gymnopus microsporus
Gymnopus monticola
Gymnopus moseri
Gymnopus mucubajiensis
Gymnopus musicola

N
Gymnopus neotropicus
Gymnopus nigritiformis
Gymnopus nivalis
Gymnopus nonnullus
Gymnopus nubicola

O
Gymnopus obscuroides
Gymnopus ocior
Gymnopus oculatus
Gymnopus omphalina
Gymnopus omphalodes
Gymnopus oncospermatis
Gymnopus oreadoides
Gymnopus orizabensis

P

Gymnopus pallidus
Gymnopus parvulus
Gymnopus perforans
Gymnopus peronatus
Gymnopus physcopodius
Gymnopus piceipes
Gymnopus pilularius
Gymnopus polygrammus
Gymnopus polyphyllus
Gymnopus potassiovirescens
Gymnopus pseudolodgeae
Gymnopus pseudoluxurians R.H.Petersen & K.W.Hughes (2014) – North America
Gymnopus pseudomphalodes
Gymnopus pubipes
Gymnopus purpureicollus
Gymnopus putillus
Gymnopus pyrenaeicus

Q
Gymnopus quercophilus

R
Gymnopus readii
Gymnopus roseilividus

S
Gymnopus semihirtipes
Gymnopus sepiiconicus
Gymnopus sinuatus
Gymnopus sphaerosporus
Gymnopus spongiosus
Gymnopus squamiger
Gymnopus stenophyllus
Gymnopus striatipes
Gymnopus subabundans
Gymnopus subaquosus
Gymnopus subavellaneus
Gymnopus subconiceps
Gymnopus subcyathiformis
Gymnopus subflavescens
Gymnopus subflavifolius
Gymnopus subfunicularis
Gymnopus sublatericius
Gymnopus subluxurians
Gymnopus subnivulosus
Gymnopus subnudus
Gymnopus subpruinosus
Gymnopus subrugosus
Gymnopus subsulphureus
Gymnopus subsupinus
Gymnopus subterginus
Gymnopus subtortipes

T
Gymnopus tamatavae
Gymnopus terginus
Gymnopus termiticola
Gymnopus texensis
Gymnopus tortipes
Gymnopus tricholoma
Gymnopus trogioides

U
Gymnopus uniformis

V
Gymnopus vernus  (Ryman) Antonín & Noordel. 2008
Gymnopus villosipes  (Cleland) Desjardin, Halling & B.A.Perry 1997
Gymnopus vinaceus  (G.Stev.) J.A.Cooper & P.Leonard 2012 – New Zealand
Gymnopus virescens  A.W.Wilson, Desjardin & E.Horak 2004
Gymnopus virginianus Murrill 1916
Gymnopus vitellinipes A.W.Wilson, Desjardin & E.Horak 2004
Gymnopus volkertii  Murrill 1916

References

Gymnopus, List
Gymnopus